The siege of Maribor was a siege of present-day Maribor, then known by its German name Marburg, in the Duchy of Styria within the Archduchy of Austria and the Holy Roman Empire. In the siege that happened during September 1532, a local garrison and citizens defended the fortified town of Maribor against the overwhelming force of the Ottoman Empire, led by their Sultan Suleiman the Magnificent and his Grand Vizier Pargalı Ibrahim Pasha. The Ottomans were marching south after their unsuccessful plan of the siege of Vienna, which was compromised at the siege of Güns where Ottomans have been delayed nearly four weeks.

Conflicts in 1532
1532 in Europe
Marburg
Marburg
Siege of Marburg
1532 in the Ottoman Empire